John Michael Ziman (16 May 1925 – 2 January 2005) was a British-born New Zealand  physicist and humanist who worked in the area of condensed matter physics. He was a spokesman for science, as well as a teacher and author.

Ziman was born in Cambridge, England, in 1925. His parents were Solomon Netheim Ziman and, Nellie Frances, née Gaster. The family emigrated to New Zealand when Ziman was a baby. He obtained his early education at Hamilton High School and the Victoria University College. He obtained his PhD from Balliol College, Oxford and did his early research on the theory of electrons in liquid metals at the University of Cambridge.

In 1964 he was appointed professor of theoretical physics at University of Bristol, where he wrote his Elements Of Advanced Quantum Theory (1969) which explains the rudiments of quantum field theory with an elementary condensed matter slant. During this period, his interests shifted towards the philosophy of science. He argued about the social dimension of science, and the social responsibility of scientists in numerous essays and books.

He married twice, to Rosemary Dixon in 1951 and secondly to Joan Solomon, and was survived by her and three of his four children.

See also
Nearly free electron model

Selected publications 

 
 	
 An Introduction to Science Studies: The Philosophical and Social Aspects of Science and Technology, Cambridge: Cambridge University Press, 1987,

References

1925 births
People from Cambridge
English Jews
2005 deaths
English physicists
British emigrants to New Zealand
New Zealand Jews
New Zealand people of English-Jewish descent
New Zealand physicists
Naturalised citizens of New Zealand
Fellows of the Royal Society
Alumni of King's College, Cambridge
Academics of the University of Bristol
People educated at Hamilton High School
Jewish physicists